Geum reptans, the creeping avens, is a species of flowering plant in the genus Geum of the family Rosaceae native to some mountains of Central and Southeastern Europe. A long-lived perennial that reproduces both sexually and clonally, it has high phenotypic variation, but these variable traits do not appear to be adaptations to local conditions.

Distribution 

It grows in rock cracks, on moraines, in moist scree fields and atop mountain summits. It is widespread in the Alps, where it is typically found at elevations of 2100–2800m, though its altitudinal range varies: from 1900 to 2500m in the Maritime Alps to as high as 3800m in the Graian Alps. It grows less extensively in the Black Forest of Germany, in some parts of the Carpathians (in the Tatras at elevations of 1440–2540m), in the Rila and Pirin mountains of Bulgaria (at altitudes of 2300–2900m), and in the Pindus, Korab, and Shar mountains of the Western Balkans.

References
<--details of Alps and Tatras-->

reptans
Flora of France
Flora of Central Europe
Flora of Southeastern Europe
Flora of Ukraine
Taxa named by Carl Linnaeus
Plants described in 1753
Flora of the Carpathians